The Bowie Handicap at Pimlico Race Course in Baltimore, Maryland was a  Thoroughbred horse race run between 1909 and 1938. A race on dirt, this once much anticipated event that drew some of the very best horses in the country was contested at distances from a mile and one-quarter to as much as two miles.

Historical notes
The inaugural running on November 9, 1909 offered a purse of $2,000 added and was won by that year's American Horse of the Year Fitz Herbert whose winning time broke the world record time for two miles on dirt.

The 1918 edition of the Bowie Handicap, set at a distance of a mile and one-half, saw something that remains a real rarity even to this day in American Thoroughbred racing when three Kentucky Derby winners finished 1-2-3. In a field of fifteen runners, jockey Frank Robinson guided the 1916 Kentucky Derby winner George Smith to an easy win in track record time. 1917 Derby winner Omar Khayyam finished second and the legendary Exterminator, the 1918 Derby victor, ran third. Noteworthy too is that the 1918 Preakness Stakes winner War Cloud finished twelfth.

The winner of the 1924 Bowie Handicap was competing for the first time in the colors of his new owner Joseph E. Widener. Under future U.S. Racing Hall of Fame jockey Ivan Parke, the three-year-old Altawood justified his purchase with a win in track record time for the mile and a half distance.

Peanuts won the 1926 running of Bowie Handicap against a very strong field. He defeated ten other starters including the future Hall of Fame inductee Princess Doreen, that year's Preakness Stakes winner Display, as well as that year's American Champion Three-Year-Old Filly Edith Cavell.

With the Great Depression at its now deepest point, the Bowie Handicap was not run from 1933 through 1936. The return of the event in 1937 saw it become the highlight win of the year for the filly Esposa while enroute to earning the first of her two American Champion Older Female Horse titles. Ridden by Canadian jockey Nick Wall, not only did Esposa win the mile and five-eighths Bowie Handicap in track record time, she did it by beating the mighty Seabiscuit by a nose.

Cancellation and transfer
With the popularity of long distance races starting to decline combined with the deep ongoing costs of the Great Depression, Pimlico's Bowie Handicap would have its final running on November 15, 1938. The mile and five-eighths race was won by Count Arthur, a six-year-old owned by Fannie Hertz, wife of the Hertz car rental company founding owner. They would become major figures in Thoroughbred racing due in large part to the success of the very great Hall of Fame runner and sire Count Fleet who won the U.S. Triple Crown in 1943.

Based in Baltimore, Maryland, Pimlico Race Course then immediately made preparations to transfer the rights to the Bowie Handicap name to Bowie Race Track near Bowie, Maryland where a new Bowie Handicap was inaugurated on April 1, 1939 run at the much shorter distance of one mile and seventy yards.

Records
Speed record:
 3:25.40 @ 2 miles: Fitz Herbert (1909)
 2:30.60 @ 1-1/2 miles: Altawood (1924)
 2:45.20 @ 1-5/8 miles: Esposa (1937)

Most wins:
 No horse ever won this race more than once.

Most wins by a jockey:
 3 - Earl Sande (1920, 1921, 1923)

Most wins by a trainer:
 4 - Samuel C. Hildreth (1909, 1911, 1915, 1920)

Most wins by an owner:
 4 - Samuel C. Hildreth (1909, 1911, 1915, 1920)

Winners

References

Discontinued horse races
Horse races in Maryland
Pimlico Race Course
Open middle distance horse races
Open long distance horse races
Recurring sporting events established in 1909
Recurring sporting events disestablished in 1939